Walter Stern may refer to:

 Walter Stern (art critic) (1896–1970), German art critic and broadcaster
 Walter Stern (athlete) (born 1972), Austrian skeleton racer
 Walter Stern (director) (born 1965), English music video film director